Piero Ciampi (Livorno,  28 September 1934  –  Rome,  19 January 1980) was an Italian singer-songwriter.

Discography

Single 
 1961: Conphiteor/La grotta dell'amore (Bluebell, BB 03044; inciso come Piero Litaliano)
 1961: L'ultima volta che la vidi/Quando il vento si leva (Bluebell, BB 03056; inciso come Piero Litaliano)
 October 1961: Fino all'ultimo minuto/Qualcuno tornerà (CGD, N 9310; inciso come Piero Litaliano)
 October 1961: Autunno a Milano/Hai lasciato a casa il tuo sorriso (CGD, N 9311; inciso come Piero Litaliano)
 January 1962: Confesso/Non siamo tutti eroi (CGD, N 9325; inciso come Piero Litaliano)
 March 1962: Lungo treno del Sud/Non siamo tutti eroi (CGD, N 9331; inciso come Piero Litaliano)
 1962: Fra cent'anni/Confesso (CGD, N 9369; inciso come Piero Litaliano)
 October 1962: Alé Alé/Fra cent'anni (CGD, N 9402; inciso come Piero Litaliano)
 1963: Un giorno o l'altro ti lascerò/E va bene (Ariel, NF 501)
 1965: Ho bisogno di vederti/Chieder perdono non è peccato (Ariel, NF 509)
 1970: Tu no/Barbara non-c'è (Det, DTP 59)
 1971: L'amore è tutto qui/Il vino (Amico ZF 50173)
 1972: Il giocatore/40 soldati 40 sorelle (Amico ZSLF 50219)
 1973: Io e te, Maria/Te lo faccio vedere chi sono io (Amico ZSLF 50276)
 January 1975: Andare camminare lavorare/Cristo tra i chitarristi (RCA Italiana TPBO 1081; promo TPBO 1091) 
 February 1975: Andare camminare lavorare/Quando finisce un amore (RCA Italiana TPJB 1101) (per juke-box; lato B cantato da Riccardo Cocciante)
 1975: Uffa che noia/Canto una suora (promo, RCA Italiana TPBO 1178)

EP 
 October 1961: Fino all'ultimo minuto/Qualcuno tornerà/Autunno a Milano/Hai lasciato a casa il tuo sorriso (CGD, E 6100)

LP e CD 
 1963: Piero Litaliano (CGD, FG 5007)
 1971: Piero Ciampi (Amico ZSLF 55041)
 February 1973: Io e te abbiamo perso la bussola (Amico DZSLF 55133)
 1975: Andare camminare lavorare e altri discorsi (RCA Italiana TPL1 1109)
 1976: Dentro e fuori (album doppio, 1976) (RCA Italiana TCL2 1184)
 1992: Il disco (Arcana; CD con cinque brani inediti del periodo RCA)

Live 
 1995: Live al Tenco '76, inediti e provini (Papiro, PA 0011295)
 2010: E continuo a cantare. Piero Ciampi live (Promo Music/Edel) (CD doppio: nel primo disco Ciampi live nel 1976 al Club Tenco e al "Ciucheba" di Castiglioncello; nel secondo disco omaggio live di artisti vari del 2008 al Teatro Regio di Parma)

Anthology 
 1981: Le carte in regola (RCA Italiana – Lineatre NL 33178)
 1990: L'album di Piero Ciampi (LP triplo/CD doppio con sette inediti, RCA NL 74506 (3))
 1995: Piero Ciampi (All the best) (CD RCA 74321 32947 2)
 1997: Il mondo di Piero Ciampi (CD RCA Italiana – Lineatre 74321 51245 2)
 2000: Non siamo tutti eroi (On Sale Music 52 OSM 049)
 2010: Piero Ciampi, le canzoni e le sue storie (CD + DVD) (Sony Music 88697651802)
 2010: Piero Ciampi (Record Service)

Tributes 
 1992: Te lo faccio vedere chi sono io! Gli amici cantano Piero Ciampi (BLU 004 CD) (19 artisti live al Teatro Argentina di Roma nel 1990)
 2000: Inciampando (Interbeat) (14 artisti live al Teatro Brancaccio di Roma nel 1995)
 2012: Cosa resta di Piero Ciampi (Arroyo Records) (18 artisti live al Premio Ciampi in vari anni)
 2013: Reinciampando. Atto primo (CD doppio Interbeat, INT0112) (contiene i tributi all'Argentina del 1990 e al Brancaccio del 1995)

Books 
 Canzoni e poesie, Roma, Lato side, 1980.
 Ho solo la faccia di un uomo. Poesie e racconti inediti, Marano Lagunare, GET, 1985.
 Tutta l'opera, Milano, Arcana, 1992. .

Rarity 
 Remolo e Romo
 Fantaradio con Renato Zero
 Rettilario

References

Bibliography 
 Enrico De Angelis, Piero Ciampi. Canzoni e poesie, Roma/Sanremo. Lato Side, 1980
 Enrico De Angelis, Piero Ciampi. Tutta l'opera, Milano, Arcana Editore, 1992. 
 Giuseppe De Grassi, Maledetti amici. Cronache di vita, amore e canzoni d'intorno a Piero Ciampi, Roma, Rai Eri, 2001. 
 Gisela Scerman, Piero Ciampi, una vita a precipizio. Il cantautore livornese raccontato dagli amici, Roma, Coniglio Editore, 2005. 
 Enrico Deregibus (a cura di), Dizionario completo della canzone italiana, Firenze, Giunti, 2006, ad vocem. 
 Enrico De Angelis, con Ugo Marcheselli, Piero Ciampi. Discografia illustrata, Roma, Coniglio Editore, 2008. 
 Gianni Marchetti, Il mio Piero Ciampi. Pagine di un incontro, Roma, Coniglio Editore, 2010. 
 Gisela Scerman, Piero Ciampi. Maledetto poeta, Roma, Arcana, 2012. 
 Enzo Gentile, Lontani dagli occhi. Vita, sorte e miracoli di artisti esemplari, Laurana Editore, 2015; capitolo Una vita come un romanzo, pagg. 59–83

Italian male  singer-songwriters
1980 deaths
1934 births
20th-century Italian male  singers